Speed Demons is a racing video game released in 1999. The game was developed and published by Microïds.

The game has 6 vehicles with possible localised damage, with three possible points of view. The game can be played as single player, 2 player split-screen, or by up to 6 players on a network. There are 10 circuits in varying locations, such as American motorways, on the sides of a volcano during its eruption and snow-covered ski slopes.

Reception

References

External links 
 Speed Demons at Microïds
 

1999 video games
Windows games
Windows-only games
Microïds games
Racing video games
Split-screen multiplayer games
Video games developed in France